Pearl Street/Arts District station (formerly Pearl station) is a DART Light Rail station located in Dallas, Texas. It is located on Bryan Street, east of Pearl Street, in the City Center District. It opened June 14, 1996, and is the easternmost station on the trunk line segment shared by the Red, Blue, Green and Orange Lines, serving the Plaza of the Americas, the Sheraton Dallas Hotel, 2001 Bryan Tower, the San Jacinto Tower, the Morton H. Meyerson Symphony Center and JPMorgan Chase Tower.

Pearl station was the original northern terminus of the Red and Blue lines before they were extended (Red in 1997 and Blue in 1999).

On July 30, 2012; Pearl was renamed as Pearl/Arts District station as part of the service changes effective for that date to better reflect new identities created by their evolving neighborhoods or surrounding developments.

East of this station, the light rail's transit mall ends and grade-separated tracks begin, with the Red, Orange and Blue lines branching north at a wye and descending into a tunnel under the expressway, while the Green Line branches southeast.

References

External links

 Dallas Area Rapid Transit - Pearl/Arts District Station

Dallas Area Rapid Transit light rail stations in Dallas
Railway stations in the United States opened in 1996
1996 establishments in Texas
Railway stations in Dallas County, Texas